Demo, usually short for demonstration, may refer to:

Music and film
Demo (music), a song typically recorded for reference rather than release
Demo (Behind Crimson Eyes), a 2004 recording by the band Behind Crimson Eyes
Demo (Deafheaven album), a 2010 EP by Deafheaven
Demo (The Flat liners Album), a 2002 album by the band The Flatliners
Demo (Miss May I album), a 2008 recording by the metalcore band Miss May I
"Demo", a 1990 single by Die Krupps
"Demo" (P-Model song), a 1979 recording by songwriters Susumu Hirasawa and Yasumi Tanaka
Demo (Skinless), a 1994 recording by the band Skinless
Demo 2004 (Year of No Light album), a 2004 recording by Year of No Light
Demo #2, an unreleased recording by Neutral Milk Hotel
Demo, 2008 debut EP by Yuna

Computing and technology
Demo (computer programming), a multimedia spectacle of programming skill
The Demo, a computer demonstration in 1968, sometimes called "the mother of all demos" 
DEMOnstration Power Station (DEMO), a proposed nuclear fusion power plant
Design & Engineering Methodology for Organizations (DEMO), an enterprise modelling methodology
Demo mode, a feature often found in consumer electronics
Game demo, a freely-distributed version of a video game
Game replay, or demo, a recording of a video game which is played back within the game's engine
Technology demo, a prototype version of a technology product

People
Demo (ancient Greek poet), ancient Greek poetess 
Demo (zsnes), one of the authors of the ZSNES software emulator
Demo Cates, Canadian musician; see Juno Awards of 1985
dEmo (artist), Spanish artist (born 1960)

Other uses
Demo (comics), a comic book series by Brian Wood and Becky Cloonan
A short form of Demonstration (protest)
Demonstration (teaching), teaching by reason or proof using examples or experiments
Product demonstration, a sales or marketing presentation
Demolition, the destruction of buildings and other structures
Exhibition game, a sporting event with no competitive value to any competitor 
DEMOs, a business process design methodology by Jan Dietz
Demo, a daughter of the gods Celeus and Metaneira
 DEMO conference, held annually by IDG for new technology products
 d.e.m.o., a defunct clothing store owned by Pac Sun

See also
Demoware, software that users can test in a limited fashion before buying
Demographics, quantifiable statistics of a given population
Demoscene, a computer art subculture that specializes in producing demos
Demos (disambiguation)
Democrat (disambiguation)
Demolition (disambiguation)
Demonstration (disambiguation)